Clifford Oldham Hagan (born December 9, 1931) is an American former professional basketball player. A 6-4 forward who excelled with the hook shot, Hagan, nicknamed "Li'l Abner", played his entire 10-year NBA career (1956–1966) with the St. Louis Hawks. He was also a player-coach for the Dallas Chaparrals in the first two-plus years of the American Basketball Association's existence (1967–1970).

College career

University of Kentucky 
Hagan played college basketball at the University of Kentucky under legendary coach Adolph Rupp. As a sophomore in 1951 he helped Kentucky win the NCAA championship with a 68–58 victory over Kansas State.

In the fall of 1952, a point shaving scandal involving three Kentucky players (a fourth player, Bill Spivey, a teammate of Hagan's on the 1951 National Championship team, was alleged to have been involved in the scandal but denied the charge) over a four-year period forced Kentucky to forfeit its upcoming season, the senior year of Hagan, Frank Ramsey and Lou Tsioropoulos. The suspension of the season made Kentucky's basketball team, in effect, the first college sports team to get the "death penalty", where the NCAA asked member schools not to schedule Kentucky, but did not mandate it.

Hagan, Ramsey and Tsioropoulos all graduated from Kentucky in 1953 and, as a result, became eligible for the NBA draft. All three players were selected by the Boston Celtics—Ramsey in the first round, Hagan in the third, and Tsioropoulos in the seventh. All three also returned to play at Kentucky despite graduating. In Kentucky's opening game that season, an 86–59 victory over Temple on December 5, 1953, Hagan scored what was a school single-game record of 51 points; this performance would not be surpassed until 1970. After finishing the regular season (one in which Hagan averaged 24.0 points per game) with a perfect 25–0 record and a #1 ranking in the Associated Press, Kentucky had been offered a bid into the NCAA tournament. However, then-existing NCAA rules prohibited graduate students from participating in post-season play; the Wildcats declined the bid because their participation would have forced them to play without Hagan, Ramsey and Tsioropoulos.

Upon graduation from Kentucky, Hagan had scored 1475 points, which ranked him third in school history, and grabbed 1035 rebounds, which placed him second, three fewer than Ramsey. In 1952 and 1954, he was named both All-American and First Team All-Southeastern Conference. Hagan still holds the record for rebounding average (min. 60 games) with 13.4 for his 77 total games from 1951–1952 and 1954. His uniform number 6 is retired by the University of Kentucky.

Professional career 
Upon graduation, Hagan, like Ramsey before him, was drafted by the Celtics. Unlike Ramsey, however, Hagan served in the military for two years after being drafted (Ramsey had served in the military for one year after his rookie season). In both of his years in the military (1954 and 1955), Hagan, stationed at Andrews Air Force Base, won Worldwide Air Force basketball championships. After his military service, Hagan and Ed Macauley were traded to the St. Louis Hawks for the draft rights to Bill Russell. In 1958, his second season in the NBA, the Hawks, led by Hagan and Bob Pettit, won the NBA championship (one of the four Western Conference titles the Hawks won during his tenure with them), defeating the Boston Celtics 4 games to 2 in the NBA Finals. Hagan was named to play in five consecutive NBA All-Star Games from 1958 to 1962 (an injury forced him to miss the 1958 classic). In his 10 NBA seasons, Hagan played 745 games and scored 13,447 points for an 18.0 average. Hagan achieved renown and respect well after his career ended, when David Halberstam wrote in his classic book The Breaks of the Game that Hagan was the only white star on the Hawks who welcomed African American teammates like Lenny Wilkens to the team and did not treat them with prejudice.

Coaching 
In 1967, the Dallas Chaparrals of the newly formed ABA hired Hagan as a player-coach. He scored 40 points in his team's first game. He also played in the very first ABA All-Star Game that season, becoming the first player to play in all-star games in both the NBA and ABA. He retired as a player three games into the 1969–1970 season and remained as Chaparral coach until midway into the season. Hagan played in 94 ABA games and scored 1,423 points for a 15.1 average.

Hagan was inducted into the Naismith Memorial Basketball Hall of Fame in 1978, the first ex-University of Kentucky player to be so honored.

Return to Kentucky 
In 1972, Hagan returned to the University of Kentucky as the school's assistant athletic director and took over the top job in 1975. He was forced to resign due to recruiting and eligibility violations in November 1988 and was replaced by one-time Kentucky teammate C. M. Newton, the head basketball coach at Vanderbilt University the year before.

In 1993, the University of Kentucky renamed its baseball field in honor of Hagan. It had previously been known as the Bernie A. Shively Sports Center.

NBA/ABA career statistics

Regular season

Playoffs

References

External links 
 

1931 births
All-American college men's basketball players
American men's basketball players
Basketball coaches from Kentucky
Basketball players from Kentucky
Boston Celtics draft picks
Dallas Chaparrals head coaches
Dallas Chaparrals players
Kentucky Wildcats athletic directors
Kentucky Wildcats men's basketball players
Living people
Naismith Memorial Basketball Hall of Fame inductees
National Basketball Association All-Stars
National Collegiate Basketball Hall of Fame inductees
Player-coaches
Small forwards
Sportspeople from Owensboro, Kentucky
St. Louis Hawks players